Hornchurch is a suburban town in East London, England, and part of the London Borough of Havering. It comprises a number of shopping streets and a large residential area. It historically formed a large ancient parish in the county of Essex that became the manor and liberty of Havering. The economic history of Hornchurch is underpinned by a shift away from agriculture to other industries with the growing significance of nearby Romford as a market town and centre of administration. As part of the suburban growth of London in the 20th century, Hornchurch significantly expanded and increased in population, becoming an urban district in 1926 and has formed part of Greater London since 1965. It is the location of Queen's Theatre, Havering Sixth Form College and Havering College of Further and Higher Education.

History

Toponymy

Hornchurch is an Anglicised version of the Latin Monasterium Cornutum (Monastery of the Horns), a term that was also applied to the mother Abbey in Savoy. The earliest recorded use here was in 1222, meaning "church with horn-like gables" and it was recorded as "Hornechurch" in 1233. The horned bull's head  mounted on the eastern end of St Andrew's Church, near the town centre dates from much later, around the 18th century.

Origins
In the Anglian Ice Age, 450,000 years ago, the ice sheet reached The Dell, just south of St Andrew's Church in Hornchurch, the furthest south any ice sheet reached in Britain. Hornchurch Cutting is a Site of Special Scientific Interest just north of St Andrews Park which exhibits the geology.

Stone Age tools, Bronze Age and Iron Age artefacts have been discovered in Hornchurch, indicating a lengthy occupation in pre-history. Roman remains, sufficient to indicate a settlement have also been found in South Hornchurch. Hornchurch originates from around the 12th century when Henry II gave  to the hospice of St Nicholas and St Bernard, Mountjoux, in Savoy as a gift. A prosperous Hornchurch Priory was established, near the parish church, but the monks were forced out during the 14th century when a new law banned foreign land ownership. The lands were then given to Lord Chancellor William of Wykeham who made major renovations to the church. He subsequently gave Hornchurch to endow New College, Oxford, which still owns all the local church lands and buildings.

Local government

Hornchurch was a large ancient parish in the Becontree hundred of Essex; it was divided into the three chapelries of Havering-atte-Bower, Hornchurch and Romford. The Hornchurch chapelry stretched from the River Thames in the south to Harold Wood in the north and was located between the River Ingrebourne in the east and the River Beam in the west. It was also known as 'Hornchurch side' and consisted of the North End, South End and Town wards. Town ward was absorbed into North End and South End around 1722. Hornchurch chapelry occupied  of the  ancient parish. The local authority was the Hornchurch vestry. The royal manor of Havering, which was conterminous with the ancient parish of Hornchurch, enjoyed special status and a charter in 1465 removed it from the Becontree hundred and the county of Essex to instead form an independent liberty. By the 16th century 'Romford side', comprising the five northern wards of Romford Town, Harold Wood, Collier Row, Noak Hill and Havering, had grown larger than Hornchurch and had achieved some degree of independence from the Hornchurch vestry. Havering ward grew independent in its own right and became a separate parish in the late 18th century.

Following the Poor Law Amendment Act 1834, Hornchurch and Romford became separate civil parishes in 1836 and were grouped into the Romford Poor Law Union. The area of the union, excluding the town of Romford, became a rural sanitary district in 1875. The special status of the Liberty of Havering was abolished in 1892 and the area was reincorporated into Essex. In 1894 the Hornchurch vestry was abolished, to be replaced by Hornchurch Parish Council. The rural sanitary district became Romford Rural District and the local authority became Romford Rural District Council. As the population of Hornchurch was rising, the parish council was abolished in 1926 and the parish was removed from the rural district. The parish of Hornchurch became Hornchurch Urban District and the local authority became Hornchurch Urban District Council. The council met at Langtons House from 1929. The urban district was significantly expanded in 1934 when the parishes of Cranham, Great Warley, North Ockendon, Rainham, Upminster and Wennington were added. The area formed part of the London Traffic Area from 1924 and the London Passenger Transport Area from 1933.  The whole area was included in the London Borough of Havering in 1965 and it was administratively transferred from Essex to Greater London.

Modern history
During both the First World War and Second World War nearby Hornchurch Airfield was an important RAF station; it was known as RAF Suttons Farm during the Great War, with its HQ as far away as Upminster Hall. During the Second World War, the airfield was known as RAF Hornchurch, and was home mostly to a number of Spitfire squadrons, with an advanced sub-station at Rayleigh. The land has since been reused for a large housing development and Hornchurch Country Park. During the First World War a large vacant country estate called Grey Towers on Hornchurch Road was commandeered by the Army Council as a military depot. In January 1916 it became the first Command Depot for the New Zealand Contingent in Britain but was found to be more suitable as a Convalescent Hospital Camp for New Zealand Servicemen, and was run as such until June 1919. Like most suburbs of London, Hornchurch had been entirely rural until the arrival of the railway which spurred huge property development during the early 1900s. Whole estates were constructed such as Emerson Park to the north. Development was fuelled further by the arrival of the electrified District line during the 1930s with inter and post war housing developments south and west of Hornchurch in places such as Elm Park.

There are 35 buildings listed by Historic England in Hornchurch. In the centre of Hornchurch St Andrew's Church is Grade I listed, and a further 11 buildings, including Langtons and Fairkytes, are Grade II listed.

Governance

The town forms part of the Hornchurch and Upminster UK Parliament constituency. Elm Park and South Hornchurch are within the Dagenham and Rainham constituency. The local authority is Havering London Borough Council, with three councillors elected from each of a number of wards covering Hornchurch. The central part of town is within the St Andrew's ward and the area around Hornchurch tube station is within the Hacton ward. Western Hornchurch is within the Hylands ward, and there are also wards for Elm Park, Emerson Park and South Hornchurch. All of Hornchurch is within the Havering and Redbridge London Assembly constituency.

Geography
The former Hornchurch civil parish was bounded with Upminster and Rainham by the River Ingrebourne to the east, with Dagenham by the River Beam to the west, with Romford to the north and by the River Thames to the south. It included the contemporary districts of Ardleigh Green, Elm Park, Emerson Park, Hornchurch town centre, Hornchurch Marshes and South Hornchurch; and parts of Gidea Park, Harold Wood and Upminster Bridge. Hornchurch is a post town in the RM postcode area, consisting of the RM11 and RM12 postcode districts. RM11 covers north of the high street including Ardleigh Green and Emerson Park, and RM12 covers south of the high street including Elm Park. The Hornchurch Marshes and South Hornchurch are within the Rainham post town and postcode district RM13.

Economy
It is not considered a significant commercial office location. Within Havering, it is identified as one of seven town centres in the borough, with a retail area extending along High Street, North Street and Station Lane.

Transport

Hornchurch is served by the following Transport for London contracted London Bus routes: 165, 193, 248, 252, 256, 365, 370 and 372.

Religion
St Andrew's Church, on High Street, is the original parish church of Hornchurch. It has been Anglican since the Reformation. There are two other Anglican parish churches: Holy Cross in Hornchurch Road, and St George's in Kenilworth Gardens, both built in the 20th century.

Hornchurch also has two Roman Catholic churches: St Mary Mother of God in Hornchurch Road, and the Church of the English Martyrs in Alma Gardens.

Culture

Hornchurch Drum & Trumpet Corps Boys marching band formed in 1959 and perform around the country. They were the first winners of the National British Marching Band Championships in 1976 and performed at the Edinburgh Tattoo in 1977.

The Towers Cinema on Hornchurch High Street opened in 1936. The Kemp & Tasker building, which was converted into a bingo hall in 1973, is noted for its Art Deco architecture. It has now been demolished to make way for a supermarket.

Hornchurch is served by Time 107.5 FM, located in Romford. The station covers Havering and surrounding areas. Bedrock is the local hospital radio service available online to the Havering area and broadcasting a range of health-related information and locally produced entertainment.

Sport
Hornchurch F.C. is the local football team, with Havering Hockey Club (formerly Hornchurch Hockey Club) accommodating the field hockey fixtures from their Harrow Lodge Park base. The Rom skatepark is located in the west of Hornchurch and is a Grade II listed structure.

Music
The local music service is Havering Music School located on Wingletye Lane. Hornchurch is also home to the drum and bass record label RAM Records.

Notable people

 Alex Day (born 1989), musician, vlogger and writer
 Lisa Thompson, children's author
 Emma Parker, snooker player
 Bobby Thompson, racing driver
 Tracey Richardson, Olympic Diver

See also
List of people from Havering
List of schools in Havering

References

 
Areas of London
Districts of the London Borough of Havering
District centres of London